Lychnorhiza  is a genus of jellyfish in the family Lychnorhizidae.

Species
The following species are recognized in the genus Lychnorhiza:

Lychnorhiza arubae Stiasny, 1920
Lychnorhiza lucerna Haeckel, 1880
Lychnorhiza malayensis Stiasny, 1920

References

Lychnorhizidae
Scyphozoan genera